Katriin Saar (born 11 March 2002) is an Estonian tennis player.

She won the Under-16 girls' singles title at the 2017 Orange Bowl.
 
Saar made her Fed Cup debut for Estonia in 2018.

ITF Circuit finals

Doubles: 3 (2–1)

Junior career
Saar has a career-high ITF juniors ranking of 186, achieved on 21 May 2018.

ITF Junior finals

Singles (5–2)

Doubles (2–2)

National representation

Fed Cup
Saar made her Fed Cup debut for Estonia in 2018, while the team was competing in the Europe/Africa Zone Group I, when she was 15 years and 334 days old.

Fed Cup (0–4)

Singles (0–3)

Doubles (0–1)

References

External links
 
 
 

2002 births
Living people
Estonian female tennis players
21st-century Estonian women